Mount Lunde is a mountain ridge close south of Mount Gleadell, in the western part of the Tula Mountains in Enderby Land, Antarctica. It was sighted by the Australian National Antarctic Research Expeditions Amundsen Bay party, under P.W. Crohn in October 1956, and was named by the Antarctic Names Committee of Australia for J. Lunde, a senior diesel mechanic at Wilkes Station in 1960.

References

Mountains of Enderby Land